Mark 32 Surface Vessel Torpedo Tubes (Mk 32 SVTT) is a torpedo launching system designed for the United States Navy.

History 
The Mark 32 has been the standard anti-submarine torpedo launching system aboard United States Navy surface vessels since its introduction in 1960, and is in use aboard the warships of several other navies.

During the FRAM Program,  and  destroyers were modernized and fitted with two Mark 32 torpedo tubes on each side of their midship. The torpedo tubes' service extended to multiple other countries such as Mexico, South Korea, Taiwan, Turkey, Egypt and many more due to the fact that decommissioned American ships were bought or transferred over to them throughout the years, notably s. 

Japan uses the HOS-301 torpedo tubes which are redesignated version of the Mark 32.

Design 
Most versions (referred to as modifications or mods) are triple-tube sets that can be rotated or trained to face a target. The exception is the Mod 9 sets, which only have two tubes and are fixed in position. The Mark 32 can fire  torpedoes of the Mark 44, Mark 46, Mark 50 (from the Mod 17 tubes onwards), and Mark 54 designs, and can be modified to use other torpedoes (such as the MU90 Impact aboard Royal Australian Navy frigates, or Royal Navy units using Sting Ray torpedoes). The tubes are designed to be fired remotely, but manual firing controls are fitted as a backup to all but the s Mod 15 sets, as all aspects of the tubes' operation are controlled remotely. The launch is powered by compressed air in a rear flask, which also doubles as each tube's breech, and the torpedoes are fire-and-forget weapons.

The launcher can be made from fibreglass, or with a fibreglass liner encased in metal. The tubes were designed to be weatherproof and capable of storing torpedoes for long periods, but this is only practical with regular maintenance. Each triple-tube set weighs around  unloaded, with variations between mods.

On board ships

United States 

 
  
 
 
 
 
 
 
 
 
 
 
 

 Long Beach-class cruiser
 
 Bainbridge-class cruiser
 
 Truxtun-class cruiser

Japan 

 
 
 
  (1959)

 
 
 
 
 
  
 
 
 
 
  (2010)
 
 
 
 Ishikari-class destroyer escort
 
 
 Kashima-class training ship
 Asuka-class experimental ship

Canada

Taiwan

Italy

Australia

South Korea

Indonesia

See also
 List of naval weapon systems

References

Torpedoes
Cold War anti-submarine weapons of the United States
Military equipment introduced in the 1960s